Yeghia Yavruyan (born on 18 October 1981) is a Russia-born Armenian former football striker. He played in the Israeli Premier League for the football club Hapoel Ashkelon F.C. He made his debut for Armenia against Moldova on 12 August 2009.

Yavruyan was born in Rostov Oblast in the Soviet Union. He came to Israel in 2004 and played in Hapoel Petah Tikva. He scored 11 goals in his first season with the team, and won the toto cup. In 2005, he joined Hapoel Tel Aviv and scored 13 goals for them. He scored the winning goal in the Israeli cup final. In 2006, he joined Hapoel Kiryat Shmona and helped the team advance to first league. In the next few years he played for other Israeli teams. In 2011, he left Israel. He also played for the Armenia national football team.

Yavruyan married an Israeli woman and have one daughter. He got his temporary resident certificate in 2008.

Honours
Toto Cup (2):
2004–05, 2008–09
State Cup (1):
2006

External links
 Player profile at www.hpt.co.il 
 

1981 births
Living people
Armenian footballers
FC Sopron players
Békéscsaba 1912 Előre footballers
Hapoel Petah Tikva F.C. players
Hapoel Tel Aviv F.C. players
Hapoel Ironi Kiryat Shmona F.C. players
FC Shinnik Yaroslavl players
Bnei Sakhnin F.C. players
Maccabi Tel Aviv F.C. players
Bnei Yehuda Tel Aviv F.C. players
Hapoel Ashkelon F.C. players
Russian Premier League players
Liga Leumit players
Israeli Premier League players
Association football forwards
Armenia international footballers
Armenian expatriate footballers
Expatriate footballers in Israel
Armenian expatriate sportspeople in Israel
Russian people of Armenian descent